The 1957 Preakness Stakes was the 82nd running of the $120,000 Preakness Stakes thoroughbred horse race. The race took place on May 18, 1957, and was televised in the United States on the CBS television network. Bold Ruler, who was jockeyed by Eddie Arcaro, won the race by one and one half lengths over runner-up Iron Liege. Approximate post time was 5:48 p.m. Eastern Time. The race was run on a fast track in a final time of 1:561/5  The Maryland Jockey Club reported total attendance of 32,856, this is recorded as second highest on the list of American thoroughbred racing top attended events for North America in 1957.

Payout 

The 82nd Preakness Stakes Payout Schedule

The full chart 

 Winning Breeder: Wheatley Stable; (KY)
 Winning Time: 1:56 1/5
 Track Condition: Fast
 Total Attendance: 32,856

References

External links 
 

1957
1957 in horse racing
1957 in American sports
1957 in sports in Maryland
Horse races in Maryland